Forest Hills Cemetery is a historic  rural cemetery, greenspace, arboretum and sculpture garden located in the Forest Hills section of the Jamaica Plain neighborhood of Boston, Massachusetts.  The cemetery was established in 1848 as a public municipal cemetery of the town of Roxbury, but was privatized when Roxbury was annexed to Boston in 1868.

Overview
Forest Hills Cemetery is located in the southern part of Boston's Jamaica Plain neighborhood.  It is roughly bounded on the southwest by Walk Hill Street, the southeast, by the American Legion Highway, and the northeast by the Arborway and Morton Street, where its entrance is located.  To the northwest, it is separated from Hyde Park Avenue by a small residential area.  It abuts Franklin Park, which lies to the northeast, and is a short distance from the Arnold Arboretum to the northwest, and forms a greenspace that augments the city's Emerald Necklace of parkland.

The cemetery has a number of notable monuments, including some by famous sculptors.  Among these are Daniel Chester French's Death Staying the Hand of the Sculptor and John Wilson's Firemen's Memorial.  Forest Hills Cemetery is an active cemetery where interments take place on most days of the year.

History
On March 28, 1848, Roxbury City Council (the municipal board in charge of the area at that time) gave an order for the purchase of the farms of the Seaverns family to establish a rural municipal park cemetery. Inspired by the Mount Auburn Cemetery, Forest Hills Cemetery was designed by Henry A. S. Dearborn to provide a park-like setting to bury and remember family and friends. In the year the cemetery was established, another  were purchased from John Parkinson. After operating as the municipal cemetary for Roxbury for seven years, it was privatized in 1868 as Roxbury was annexed by neighboring Boston. In 1893, the first crematorium in Massachusetts was added to the cemetery, along with other features like a scattering garden, an indoor columbarium and an outdoor columbarium. In 1927, anarchists Nicola Sacco and Bartolomeo Vanzetti were cremated here after their execution; their ashes were later returned to Italy.

Notable persons interred at Forest Hills

 Harrison Henry Atwood, US House of Representatives (1895–1897), Architect of Boston
 Simon Willard celebrated U.S. clockmaker
 Rufus Anderson, missionary and author
 Hugh Bancroft, president of The Wall Street Journal
 Clarence W. Barron, president of Dow Jones & Company
 Cyrus Augustus Bartol, American preacher and writer
 Amy Beach, composer and pianist
 Andrew Carney, Entrepreneur and Philanthropist
 James Freeman Clarke, author
 Channing H. Cox, Governor of Massachusetts (1921–1925)
 E. E. Cummings, poet and artist
 Fanny Davenport, actress
 William Dawes (possible), tanner and American colonial minuteman
 William Dwight (1831–1888), general in American Civil War
 Eugene N. Foss, Governor of Massachusetts (1911–1914)
 Lee M. Friedman (1871–1957), lawyer and historian
 William Lloyd Garrison, abolitionist
 William Gaston, Governor of Massachusetts (1875–1876)
 Kahlil Gibran (1922–2008), Sculptor
 Adoniram Judson Gordon (1836–1895), preacher, writer, composer, and founder of Gordon College
 Curtis Guild, Governor of Massachusetts (1906–1909)
 Edward Everett Hale, author
 William Heath, general in American Revolutionary War
 Karl Heinzen, author
 Rev. Edgar J. Helms, Founder of Goodwill Industries
 Charles Hiller Innes, Massachusetts Politician
 Jennie Kimball, 19th-century actor, soubrette, theatrical manager
 Faik Konitza, Albanian thinker, writer, journalist, politician
 Samuel P. Langley, aviation pioneer, namesake of NASA Langley Research Center
 Reggie Lewis, basketball player for Boston Celtics
 Francis Cabot Lowell, after whom Lowell, Massachusetts is named
 John Lowell, 18th century federal judge
 John Lowell, 19th century federal judge
 Martin Milmore, sculptor
 Carlotta Monterey, actor and wife of Eugene O'Neill
 Godfrey Morse (1846–1911), lawyer
 Albert W. Nickerson, railroad executive
 Theofan S. Noli, Bishop, Prime Minister of Albania
 Eugene O'Neill, playwright
 Joseph C. Pelletier, district attorney of Suffolk County, Massachusetts and the Supreme Advocate of the Knights of Columbus
 Ambrose Ranney (1821–1899), U.S. Representative from Massachusetts
 Anne Sexton, poet
 Pauline Agassiz Shaw, reformer and philanthropist
 Lysander Spooner, early American abolitionist, writer, anarchist
 Amy Wentworth Stone, children's writer
 Lucy Stone, suffragist
 Anna Eliot Ticknor, distance learning pioneer
 George Ticknor scholar, founding Trustee of the Boston Public Library
 Joseph William Torrey, merchant, founder of the American colony of "Ellena" in Borneo
 Joseph Warren, physician and patriot, killed at Battle of Bunker Hill
 Lawrence Whitney, Olympic bronze medalist
 Mary Evans Wilson, civil rights activist
 John A. Winslow, admiral in American Civil War
 Jacob Wirth, restaurateur
 Two British war graves, of a Royal Field Artillery soldier of World War I and a Merchant Navy sailor of World War II.

Gallery

See also
 List of cemeteries in Boston, Massachusetts
 National Register of Historic Places listings in southern Boston, Massachusetts

References

Further reading 
 Sammarco, Anthony Mitchell, Forest Hills Cemetery, Arcadia Publishing, Images of America series, 2009

External links

 Forest Hills Cemetery official site
 Forest Hills Educational Trust
 
 Photos of Forest Hills Cemetery
 Heart of the City article and photos

Cemeteries in Jamaica Plain, Boston
Cemeteries on the National Register of Historic Places in Massachusetts
1848 establishments in Massachusetts
National Register of Historic Places in Boston
Jamaica Plain, Boston
Rural cemeteries